Shamar Amaro Nicholson (born 16 March 1997) is a Jamaican professional footballer who plays as a forward for Russian Premier League club Spartak Moscow and the Jamaica national team.

Club career

Boys' Town 
Nicholson was developed in the Boys' Town youth system and made the transition to the first team in 2015–16. He had a trial with Real Salt Lake in 2015.

Domžale 
In September 2017, Nicholson signed with Domžale in Slovenia.

Charleroi
Nicholson joined Belgian club Charleroi in August 2019, signing a four-year deal.

Spartak Moscow
On 21 December 2021, Nicholson signed for Russian Premier League club Spartak Moscow on a four-and-a-half year contract. He scored his first hat-trick on 2 March 2022, in his second game for the club during a 6–1 Cup win over PFC Kuban Krasnodar. He also went on to win the Russian Cup that season in a 2–1 win over Dynamo Moscow.

International career
Nicholson played for the Jamaica U20 national team at the 2015 CONCACAF U-20 Championship.

He made his senior national team debut in February 2017. Nicholson scored his first goal for Jamaica on 5 June 2019 in a friendly against the United States.

Career statistics

Club

International

Scores and results list Jamaica's goal tally first, score column indicates score after each Nicholson goal.

Honours
Spartak Moscow
Russian Cup: 2021–22

Jamaica
CONCACAF Gold Cup runner-up: 2017
Caribbean Cup runner-up: 2017

References

External links
 

1997 births
Living people
Sportspeople from Kingston, Jamaica
Jamaican footballers
Jamaica youth international footballers
Jamaica under-20 international footballers
Jamaica international footballers
Association football forwards
Jamaican expatriate footballers
NK Domžale players
R. Charleroi S.C. players
FC Spartak Moscow players
National Premier League players
Slovenian PrvaLiga players
Belgian Pro League players
Russian Premier League players
Expatriate footballers in Slovenia
Expatriate footballers in Belgium
Expatriate footballers in Russia
Jamaican expatriate sportspeople in Slovenia
Jamaican expatriate sportspeople in Belgium
Jamaican expatriate sportspeople in Russia
2015 CONCACAF U-20 Championship players
2017 CONCACAF Gold Cup players
2019 CONCACAF Gold Cup players
2021 CONCACAF Gold Cup players